Excelsior is an unincorporated community in Webster County, West Virginia, United States. It is located along County Route 36/1.

References 

Unincorporated communities in Webster County, West Virginia
Unincorporated communities in West Virginia